The 3rd Canadian Women's Hockey League All-Star Game took place on February 12, 2017, at Air Canada Centre in Toronto, Ontario, Canada. The event featured three 20-minute periods, and 34 players were named as participants Jess Jones and Jillian Saulnier both scored a hat trick, becoming the first competitors in CWHL All-Star Game history to achieve the feat.

News and notes

Fan balloting
Voting for CWHL all-star captains started in January 2017. Online voting required fans to vote on the CWHL.com web site. Fans are presented with a list of 34 players. Carlee Campbell of the Toronto Furies led all players in the online voting, capturing 2088 votes. She would be named captain of Team White. Natalie Spooner and Meaghan Mikkelson both captured 11.71% of possible online votes, both sharing in the captaincy for Team Blue. Of note, this marked the first time that one team in the CWHL All-Star Game had two captains.

Alumni coaches
In celebration of the CWHL's tenth anniversary season, a group of four former players were named as Alumni Coaches for the All-Star Game. Among them were Lisa-Marie Breton, Tessa Bonhomme, Becky Kellar and Cheryl Pounder. Each of these alumni coaches were eligible for selection in the Frozen Fantasy Draft.

Rosters

Fantasy draft
The draft of the players took place on February 10, 2017 at 8:00 pm, Eastern time. It was held at the Hilton Hotel in Toronto.

With the first pick overall, Team White's Carlee Campbell selected Marie-Philip Poulin. It marked the second year in a row that Poulin was taken first overall in the Frozen Fantasy Draft. As Team Blue had two captains, Meaghan Mikkelson and Natalie Spooner, they were only allocated four draft picks, while Team White was allowed five picks. The remaining rosters were determined with a random stick draw.

As alumni coaches were also subject to the Frozen Fantasy Draft process, Team White once again had the prestige of the first pick overall, selecting Tessa Bonhomme. Team Blue would acquire Cheryl Pounder with the second pick overall. With their final selection, Team White picked Becky Kellar as their second alumni coach, while Lisa-Marie Breton-Lebreux would end up with Team Blue.

Players named

Game summary
Team White skaters Jess Jones and Jillian Saulnier became the first competitors to score a hat trick in CWHL All-Star Game history. Team Blue outshot Team White by a 39-36 margin. Team Blue starting goaltender Emerance Maschmeyer stopped 14 of 17 shots, while Howe was 13 of 18. Team White starting goaltender Christina Kessler recorded shutout play, facing 18 shots, while Labonte stopped 16 of 20 shots.

References 

Canadian Women's Hockey League
2017 Canadian Womens Hockey League All-Star Game
2016–17 in Canadian women's ice hockey
2017 in Ontario
2010s in Toronto